Peadar N. Quealy (born 1956) is an Irish former hurler. At club level he played with Roscrea and was also a member of the Tipperary senior hurling team.

Career

Quealy first played hurling at juvenile and underage levels with Roscrea and won a divisional minor title in 1974. He also lined out as a Gaelic footballer with Inane Rovers and won a Tipperary U21AFC title in 1977. As a student at University College Dublin Quealy was called-up to the college hurling team and won a Fitzgibbon Cup medal in 1979. By this stage he had already joined the Roscrea senior team and won a Tipperary SHC title in 1980. Quealy also won two North Tipperary SHC titles, including one as team captain.

Quealy first played for Tipperary during a two-year tenure as a dual player at minor level in 1973 and 1974. He continued his dual status to under-21 level, however, his underage career ended without any silverware. Queally was drafted onto the Tipperary senior hurling team in 1977 and won a National League medal in 1979. He served as team captain in 1981.

Honours

University College Dublin
Fitzgibbon Cup: 1979

Inane Rovers
Tipperary Under-21 A Football Championship: 1977

Roscrea
Tipperary Senior Hurling Championship: 1980 
North Tipperary Senior Hurling Championship: 1980, 1982 (c)
North Tipperary Minor A Hurling Championship: 1974

Tipperary
National Hurling League: 1978-79

References

External link

 Peadar Quealy player profile

1956 births
Living people
UCD hurlers
Roscrea hurlers
Inane Rovers Gaelic footballers
Tipperary inter-county hurlers
Tipperary inter-county Gaelic footballers